No Surprise may refer to:
"No Surprise" (Daughtry song), 2009
"No Surprise" (Theory of a Deadman song), 2005
"No Surprise", a 1998 song by Ratt from the album Reach for the Sky
"No Surprises", a 1998 single by Radiohead

See also
"No Surprize", a song by Aerosmith